Ahmed Mohamed Ismail (born 6 June 1964) is a retired marathon runner who competed internationally for Somalia. He lived and trained in Hartford, Connecticut.

Ismail competed at the 1984 Summer Olympics in Los Angeles, finishing in 47th position out of the 107 runners who started. In October 1986 he won the Detroit Free Press Marathon. He also competed in the 1988 Summer Olympics in Seoul, but he did not complete the marathon.

References

External links
 

1964 births
Living people
Olympic athletes of Somalia
Athletes (track and field) at the 1984 Summer Olympics
Athletes (track and field) at the 1988 Summer Olympics
Somalian male marathon runners